Quercus montana, the chestnut oak, is a species of oak in the white oak group, Quercus sect. Quercus. It is native to the eastern United States, where it is one of the most important ridgetop trees from southern Maine southwest to central Mississippi, with an outlying northwestern population in southern Michigan. It is also sometimes called rock oak because of its presence in montane and other rocky habitats.

Description 
This species is often an important canopy species in an oak-heath forest.

It is readily identified by its massively-ridged dark gray-brown bark, the thickest of any eastern North American oak. The chinkapin oak also has much smaller acorns than the chestnut oak. The chestnut oak is easily distinguished from the swamp white oak because that tree has whitened undersides on the leaves. Another important distinction between the chestnut oak and the swamp chestnut oak is by the habitat; if it grows on a ridge, it is chestnut oak, and if it grows in wet bottomlands, it is probably the more massive swamp chestnut oak; however, this is not fully reliable.

Characteristics include:
 Bark: Dark, fissured into broad ridges, scaly. Branchlets stout, at first bronze green, later they become reddish brown, finally dark gray or brown. Heavily charged with tannic acid.
 Wood: Dark brown, sapwood lighter; heavy, hard, strong, tough, close-grained, durable in contact with the soil. Specific gravity 0.7499; weight of cubic foot, .
 Winter buds: Light chestnut brown, ovate, acute, one-fourth to one-half of an inch long.
They come out of the bud convolute, yellow green or bronze, shining above, very pubescent below. When full grown are thick, firm, dark yellow green, somewhat shining above, pale green and pubescent below; midribs stout, yellow, primary veins conspicuous. In autumn they turn a dull yellow soon changing to a yellow brown. Petioles stout or slender, short. Stipules linear to lanceolate, caducous.
 Flowers: May, when leaves are one-third grown. Staminate flowers are borne in hairy catkins (aments) two to three inches long; calyx pale yellow, hairy, deeply seven to nine-lobed; stamens 7 to 9; anthers bright yellow. Pistillate flowers in short spikes; peduncles green, stout, hairy; involucral scales hairy; stigmas short, bright red.
 Acorns: Annual, singly or in pairs; nut oval, rounded or acute at apex, bright chestnut brown, shining, one and a quarter to one and one-half inches in length; cup, cup-shaped or turbinate, usually enclosing one-half or one-third of the nut, thin, light brown and downy within, reddish brown and rough outside, tuberculate near the base. Scales small, much crowded toward the rim sometimes making a fringe. Kernel white, sweetish.

Taxonomy and nomenclature 
Extensive confusion between the chestnut oak (Quercus montana) and the swamp chestnut oak (Quercus michauxii) has occurred, and some botanists have considered them to be the same species in the past.

The name Quercus prinus was long used by many botanists and foresters for either the chestnut oak or the swamp chestnut oak, with the former otherwise called Q. montana or the latter otherwise called Q. michauxii. The application of the name Q. montana to the chestnut oak is now accepted, since Q. prinus is of uncertain position, unassignable to either species.

The Latin specific epithet montana refers to mountains or coming from mountains which probably refers to the tree's habitat and its ability to grow on rocks.

Ecology 

This species is a predominant ridge-top tree in eastern North American hardwood forests. Young chestnut oaks are easily capable of reproducing from stump sprouts if cut. A significant amount of chestnut oaks in the Appalachians are trees that regrew from stump sprouts after being logged. It is a long-lived tree, with high-quality timber when well-formed. The acorns of the chestnut oak are a valuable wildlife food.

Uses 
Chestnut oak trees are generally not the best timber trees because they are usually branched low and not very straight, but when they grow in better conditions, they are valuable for timber, which is marketed as 'mixed white oak'. The bark of chestnut oak has a high tannin content and prior to the 20th century was heavily used in the leather tanning industry, but the wood was usually discarded since it was considered inferior to that of Q. alba. By the late 19th century, as the population of mature white oaks in the eastern US was dwindling, loggers began exploiting chestnut oak wood more heavily. It serves many of the same applications as white oak wood and as it is fairly rot-proof, has also been used for fencing, railroad ties, and other uses where the wood comes into contact with soil. Due to a relatively high density ( per cu. ft), chestnut oak makes excellent firewood.

The acorns can be eaten by humans but, if bitter, may need to have the tannins leached.

See also 
 Central Appalachian dry oak–pine forest

References

External links 
 
 

montanus
Hardwood forest plants
Trees of the Eastern United States
Trees of Eastern Canada
Trees of the Great Lakes region (North America)
Flora of the Northeastern United States
Flora of the Southeastern United States
Flora of the Appalachian Mountains
Plants described in 1753
Taxa named by Carl Linnaeus